Leopold Herenčić (born 5 April 1948) is a Serbian weightlifter. He competed in the men's lightweight event at the 1972 Summer Olympics.

References

1948 births
Living people
Serbian male weightlifters
Olympic weightlifters of Yugoslavia
Weightlifters at the 1972 Summer Olympics
People from Odžaci